Serwitut may refer to the following places:
Serwitut (sołectwo Czarna) in Łódź Voivodeship (central Poland)
Serwitut (sołectwo Stolec) in Łódź Voivodeship (central Poland)
Serwitut, Opole Voivodeship (south-west Poland)